Waray (also known as Waray-Waray or Bisaya/Binisaya nga Winaray/Waray,  meaning Samar language) is an Austronesian language and the fifth-most-spoken native regional language of the Philippines, native to Eastern Visayas. It is the native language of the Waray people and second language of the Abaknon people of Capul, Northern Samar, and some Cebuano-speaking peoples of western and southern parts of Leyte island. It is the third most spoken language among the Bisayan languages, only behind Cebuano and Hiligaynon.

Nomenclature
The term Waray comes from the word often heard by non-speakers meaning 'none' or 'nothing' in the language; similarly, Cebuanos are known in Leyte as mga Kana and their language as Kana (after the oft-heard word , meaning 'that' in the Cebuano language).

During the Spanish period, texts refer to the language as simply being a dialect of "Visayan". In contrast, most contemporary linguists consider many of these "Visayan dialects" (e.g., Cebuano, Hiligaynon, Karay-a, etc.) to be distinct languages, and the term Visayan is usually taken to refer to what is called Cebuano in contemporary linguistic literature. Domingo Ezguerra's 1663 (reprinted 1747)  refers to the "Visayan tongue of the province of Leyte", Figueroa's  refers to the "Visaya language of Samar and Leyte". Antonio Sanchez's 1914  (Spanish-Visayan Dictionary) refers to the speech of "Sámar and Leyte".

Dialects
Linguist Jason Lobel (2009) considers there are 25 dialects and subdialects of Waray-Waray.

 Tacloban: "standard" dialect: the dialect used in television and radio broadcasts and in education 
 Abuyog, Leyte: heavy Cebuano influence
 Culaba, Biliran: heavy Cebuano influence
 Catbalogan: "original" dialect: Pure Waray, central part of Samar Island
 Calbayog: mixture of the Tacloban dialect and the dialect of Northern Samar 
 Allen, Northern Samar: mostly Waray Sorsoganon mixed with Northern Samarenyo. Dialects in neighboring towns have also borrowed extensively from Waray Sorsoganon.

Many Waray dialects feature a sound change in which Proto-Bisayan *s becomes  in a small number of common grammatical morphemes. This sound change occurs in all areas of Samar south of the municipalities of Santa Margarita, Matuginao, Las Navas, and Gamay (roughly corresponding to the provinces of Samar and Eastern Samar, but not Northern Samar), as well as in all of the Waray-speaking areas of Leyte, except the towns of Javier and Abuyog. However, this sound change is an areal feature rather than a strictly genetic one (Lobel 2009).

Most Waray dialects in northeastern and Eastern Samar have the close central unrounded vowel  as a reflex of Proto-Austronesian *e.

Usage

Waray is one of the many regional languages found in the Philippines and used in local government.
It is widely used in media particularly in television and radio broadcasts, however, not in print media because most regional newspapers are published in English.

The language is used in education from kindergarten to primary level as part of the Philippine government's K–12 program since 2012 in which pupils from kindergarten to third grade are taught in their respective indigenous languages.

Waray is also used in the Mass in the Roman Catholic Church and in the worship services of different Christian sects in the region. Bibles in Waray are also available.  In 2019, the New World Translation of the Holy Scriptures was released in Waray-Waray. However, there is a growing population of Muslims in the region with the first mosque, Tacloban Mosque and Islamic Center, through a charity built by a Turkish Islamic religious authority in Tacloban at 2017 which teaches the scriptures and offers Friday sermons in both Waray and Cebuano in general.

Phonology

Vowels 

Consonants 
Waray has a total of 16 consonant phonemes: . Two extra postalveolar sounds  are heard when  occurs after , further proceeding another vowel sound.

Grammar

Writing system 
Waray, like all Philippine languages today, is written using the Latin script. There is no officially-approved orthography for the language and different writers may use differing orthographic styles. In general, it has become common to write the language following the current orthographic conventions of Filipino.

Vocabulary
Waray uses many different words to specify a particular thing. These words might not be the same in spelling and in construction but they share the same meaning, making it a very diverse language.
 
Here are some examples of demonstratives and adverbs together with their equivalent definition in Waray-Waray:

Verbs

Numbers
Native numbers are used for numbers one through ten. Some, especially the old ones, are spoken alongside the Spanish counterparts.

Loanwords and cognates
Waray has borrowed vocabulary extensively from other languages, especially from Spanish. These words are being adopted to fill lexical gaps of the recipient language. Spanish colonialization introduced new systems to the Philippine society.

See also
 Waray people
 Waray literature
 Waray Wikipedia
 Languages of the Philippines
 Samar
 Leyte
 Waray Sorsogon language

References

Further reading
 Abuyen, Tomas A. (2005). Dictionary English Waray-Waray/Tagalog, National Book Store, 494 pp., .
 
 Rubino, Carl. Waray-Waray. In Garry, Jane and Carl Rubino (eds.), Facts About the World's Languages, An Encyclopedia of the World's Languages: Past and Present (2001), pp. 797–800.

External links

 Arte de la Lengua Bisaya de la Provincia de Leyte – Google Books
 Arte del idioma visaya de Samar y Leite – Google Books
 Diccionario espanol-bisaya para las provincias de Sámar y Leyte – University of Michigan collection
 Radyo Waraynon – Waraynon Internet Radio Station
 Waray Museum Blog featuring Waray literature
 Waray lessons
 Bansa.org Waray Dictionary
 Waray dictionary, literary database & teaching resource
 Waray-Waray Dictionary by Andras Rajki 
 SEAlang Library Waray Resources
A large collection of bible study material in Waray language (free audio books, videos, publications) – Jehovah's Witnesses

 
Waray